Frederik Emil Olsen (born 3 October 2002) is a Danish-born Swedish taekwondo athlete. He won the bronze medal at the 2021 European Taekwondo Championships at the under 58 kg weight category.

Early life 
Olsen was born in Copenhagen, Denmark but at 10 years old moved to Skellefteå, Sweden to sign a contract with Soo Shim, after he revealed his natural talent at taekwondo sparring. His most viewed sparring video on youtube has over half a million views as he was known as "The Taekwondo Kid" at the time, being invited to Kukkiwon several times for promoting the sport and being considered a prodigy by them. Later on, he won the bronze medal at the 2015 European Cadets Championship for Denmark.

References

External links 

 

Swedish male taekwondo practitioners
Living people
2002 births
European Taekwondo Championships medalists